Queen Inhyeon (Hangul: 인현왕후 민씨, Hanja: 仁顯王后 閔氏; 15 May 1667 – 16 September 1701), of the Yeoheung Min clan, was the second wife and queen consort of King Sukjong, the 19th Joseon monarch. She was Queen of Joseon from 1681 until her deposition in 1688, and from her reinstatement in 1694 until her death in 1701. She is one of the best known queens in Korean history and her life has been portrayed in many historical dramas.

Biography
Born during King Hyeonjong’s 8th year of reign on 15 May 1667 into the Yeoheung Min clan, the future queen was the second daughter of Min Yu-jung, and his second wife, Lady Song of the Eunjin Song clan. Through her mother, Lady Min was the maternal granddaughter of Song Jun-gil, who was a member of the Seoin faction. As well as a distant relative of Queen Myeongseong and the great-great-granddaughter of Yi Eon-jeok. Lady Min's character was known to be highly virtuous, benevolent, and kind.

One year after Queen Ingyeong’s death, Queen Dowager Hyeonryeol and Song Si-yeol (who was from the Seoin faction and later the Noron faction), and being one of the Queen Dowager’s and Lady Min’s maternal relative, had recommended Lady Min to become the next Queen Consort of the reigning king.

She later married King Sukjong in 1681 at the age of 14 and became his second queen consort. Her parents were royally entitled as Internal Prince Yeoyang (여양부원군, Yeoyang Buwongun), and her mother as Internal Princess Consort Eunseong (은성부부인; Eunseong Bubuin). Her father’s first wife was also royally entitled as Internal Princess Consort Haepung (해풍부부인, 海豊府夫人; Haepung Bubuin) as well as his third wife, Internal Princess Consort Pungchang (풍창부부인, 豊昌府夫人; Pungchang Bubuin).

It was said that during the early years of the marriage, she did not receive any affection from the King as he went to Palace Lady Jang. As queen, it was stated that she handled everything with generosity and with an open mind.

Palace Lady Jang was then banished from the palace by the Queen Dowager as she didn’t want her son to be influenced from the political faction she was affiliated with. But after her mother-in-law’s death in 1684, King Sukjong brought back and went to Palace Lady Jang for comfort and soon favored her as his concubine. Because of this, the Queen recommended Kim Su-hang's granddaughter (since Kim Su-hang was also a member of the Seoin faction), Lady Kim of the Andong Kim clan (later Royal Noble Consort Yeong), as his concubine to keep Lady Jang in check, but she was unsuccessful.

When Sukjong's concubine who belonged to the Southerners (Nam-in) faction, So-ui Jang Ok-jeong, give birth to a son, Yi Yun in 1688, it created a bloody dispute called Gisa Hwanguk (기사환국). During this time, Sukjong wanted to give this eldest son (entitled the wonja, literally the "First Son") the title of "Crown Prince" and wanted to promote Jang Ok-jeong from So-ui to Hui-bin.

This action was opposed by the Westerners (Seoin) faction, who supported the Queen led by Song Si-yeol, and this was supported by the Nam-in faction, who supported Jang Ok-jeong.

The King pushed for a compromise in which the Queen would adopt Yi Yun as her son. However, the Queen refused to do so. Sukjong became angry at the opposition, and many were killed, including Song Si-yeol. Many, including the Queen's family, were forced into exile. The Queen herself was deposed in 1688 and exiled to a closed temple in Cheongeumsa Temple, Gimcheon-si, Gyeongsangbuk Province where she became a devoted Buddhist.

After that, Jang Ok-jeong was eventually elevated from Royal Consort So-ui (senior second rank) to Royal Noble Consort Hui (Hui-bin) (senior first rank) and soon after appointed as queen consort.

The Seoin faction split into the Noron (Old Learning) faction and the Soron (New Learning) faction. In the meantime, Kim Chun-taek who was member of the Noron faction and Han Jung-hyuk from the Soron faction, staged a campaign to reinstate the Deposed Queen. In 1693, Sukjong's new favorite, a palace maid from Haeju Choe clan, was officially elevated as a royal concubine with the rank of Suk-won (Senior 4th rank). Royal Consort Suk-won (later Royal Noble Consort Suk), was an open supporter of the Deposed Queen Min and encouraged the King to reinstate her to her original position as queen.

Later, Sukjong felt remorse at his temperamental actions during Gisa Hwanguk. He also grew disgusted by the greed of the Nam-in faction and the ever-powerful Jang family. In the government, the Nam-in attempt to purge Seoin on charge of plotting to reinstate the Deposed Queen backfired.

The King banished Jang Hui-jae, Jang Ok-jeong's older brother, and the leaders of the Nam-in party. In 1694, he officially demoted Jang Ok-jeong to her former position, Hui-bin, and he reinstated the Deposed Queen as queen consort and brought her back into the palace. This incident is called Gapsul Hwanguk (갑술환국). The Nam-in faction would never recover from this purge politically.

In 1701, aged 34, the Queen became ill and died of an unknown disease. Some sources say that she was poisoned. But the late Queen was posthumously honoured as Queen Inhyeon (인현왕후, 仁顯王后).

It has been said that Sukjong, while mourning for Inhyeon, dreamed of her in a sobok dress drenched with blood. Sukjong asked Inhyeon of how she died, but Inhyeon didn't say anything, but pointed in to the direction of Jang Hui-bin's chambers. Sukjong awoke, then went into Hui-bin's chambers. While approaching, he heard music and sounds of laughter. Eavesdropping, he saw Jang Hui-bin with Shamanist priestesses in her chambers, praying for the Queen's death, while striking a figurine with arrows. When this was discovered by Sukjong, Jang Hui-bin was executed for her actions by poison.

One of Queen Inhyeon's ladies in waiting wrote a book called Queen Inhyeon's Story (Hangul: 인현왕후전, Hanja: 仁顯王后傳), which still exists today. She was buried in Myeongreung (명릉,明陵) in Gyeonggi Province, and Sukjong was later buried near her in the same area. She has no issue to Sukjong.

Family
 Great-Great-Great-grandfather
 Min Hyo-son (민효손, 閔孝孫)
 Great-Great-Great-Grandmother
 Lady Yun of the Papyeong Yun clan (파평 윤씨); daughter of Yun Ji-kang (윤지강)
 Great-Great-Grandfather
 Min Yeo-jun (민여준, 閔汝俊) (1539 - 1599)
 Adoptive Great-Great-Grandfather - Min Yeo-geon (민여건, 閔汝健) (1538 - 1585)
 Great-Great-Grandmother
 Lady Yi of the Jeonju Yi clan (전주 이씨, 全州 李氏); descendant of Grand Prince Hyoryeong
 Great-Grandfather
 Min Gi (민기, 閔機) (1568 - 18 January 1641)
 Great-Grandmother
 Lady Hong of the Namyang Hong clan (남양 홍씨, 南陽 洪氏); daughter of Hong Ik-hyeon (홍익현, 洪翼賢)
 Grandfather 
 Min Gwang-hun (민광훈, 閔光勳) (1595 – 1659)
 Grandmother 
 Lady Yi of the Yeonan Yi clan (연안 이씨); daughter of Yi Gwang-jeong (이광정, 李光庭) (1552 – 1629)
 Father: Min Yu-jung, Internal Prince Yeoyang (민유중, 여양부원군) (1630 – 29 June 1687)
 Uncle: Min Si-jong (민시중, 閔蓍重) (1625 – 1677)
 Aunt: Lady Hong of the Pungsan Hong clan (풍산 홍씨)
 Cousin: Min Jin-ha (민진하, 閔鎭夏)
 Cousin: Min Jin-ju (민진주, 閔鎭周) (1646 – 1700)
 Cousin: Min Jin-ro (민진로, 閔鎭魯) (1662 – 1684)
 Uncle: Min Jeong-jung (민정중, 閔鼎重) (1628 – 25 June 1692)
 Aunt: Lady Shin of the Pyeongsan Shin clan (평산 신씨)
 Aunt: Lady Hong of the Namyang Hong clan (남양 홍씨)
 Cousin: Min Jin-jang (민진장, 閔鎭長) (1649 – 1700)
 Cousin-in-law: Lady Nam of the Uiryeong Nam clan (의령 남씨)
 First cousin: Min Jae-su (민재수, 閔在洙)
 First cousin twice: Min Baek-nam (민백남, 閔百男)
 First cousin: Min Gye-su (민계수, 閔啓洙)
 First cousin twice: Min Baek-bong (민백붕, 閔百朋)
 First cousin: Min Ahn-su (민안수, 閔安洙)
 First cousin twice: Min Baek-jing (민백징, 閔百徵)
 First cousin: Min Hak-su (민학수, 閔學洙)
 First cousin twice: Min Baek-neung (민백능, 閔百能)
 First cousin: Min Deok-su (민덕수, 閔德洙)
 First cousin twice: Min Baek-heon (민백헌, 閔百憲)
 Cousin: Lady Min of the Yeoheung Min clan (여흥 민씨, 驪興 閔氏)
 Cousin-in-law: Yi In-seok (이인식, 李寅烒)
 Aunt: Lady Yi of the Jeonju Yi clan (전주 이씨); daughter of Yi Gyeong-jeong, Prince Jeonpyeong (이경정 전평군, 李慶禎 前評君)
 Aunt: Lady Yi of the Jeonju Yi clan (전주 이씨); daughter of Yi Suk (이숙) (? – 1680)
 Cousin: Lady Min of the Yeoheung Min clan (11 August 1663 – 17 September 1680)
 Cousin-in-law: Yi Hwan (이훤, 李煊)
 Aunt: Lady Min of the Yeoheung Min clan (여흥 민씨, 驪興 閔氏)
 Uncle: Hong Man-hyeong (홍만형, 洪萬衡) (1633 – 1679)
 Cousin: Hong Jong-mo (홍중모, 洪重模)
 Cousin: Hong Jong-hae (홍중해, 洪重楷)
 Stepmother: Yi Hyo-ah, Internal Princess Consort Haepung of the Deoksu Yi clan (이효아 해풍부부인 덕수 이씨, 李孝兒 海豊府夫人 德水 李氏) (1628 – 1652)
 Step-grandfather: Yi Gyeong-jeung (이경증, 李景曾) (1595 – 1648)
 Step-grandmother: Yi Gye-yeo, Lady Yi of the Jeonju Yi clan (이계여 정부인 전주 이씨 계여, 李桂餘 貞夫人 全州 李氏 桂餘) (1598 – ?)
 Mother: Internal Princess Consort Eunseong of the Eunjin Song clan (은성부부인 은진 송씨, 恩城府夫人 恩津 宋氏) (1637 – 1672); Min Yu-jung's second wife
 Grandfather: Song Jun-gil (송준길) (28 December 1606 – 2 December 1672)
 Grandmother: Lady Jeong of the Jinju Jeong clan (증 정경부인 진주 정씨, 贈 貞敬夫人 晉州 鄭氏)
 Stepmother: Internal Princess Consort Pungchang of the Pungyang Jo clan (풍창부부인 풍양 조씨, 豊昌府夫人 豐壤 趙氏) (1659 – 1741)

Sibling(s)

 Older half-brother: Min Jin-oh (민진오, 閔鎭五)
 Sister-in-law: Lady Hwang of the Pyeonghae Hwang clan (평해 황씨, 平海 黃氏)
 Nephew: Min Chi-su (민치수, 閔致洙)
 Grandnephew: Min Baek-yong (민백용, 閔百用)
 Older sister: Lady Min of the Yeoheung Min clan (여흥 민씨, 驪興 閔氏) (1656 – 1728)
 Brother-in-law: Yi Man-chang (이만창)
 Nephew − Yi Jae (이재, 李縡) (1680 – 1746)
 Older brother: Min Jin-hu (민진후) (1659 – 1720)
 Sister-in-law: Lady Yi of the Yeonan Yi clan (연안 이씨, 延安 李氏); daughter of Yi Dan-sang (이단상, 李端相)
 Niece: Lady Min of the Yeoheung Min clan (여흥 민씨, 驪興 閔氏)
 Nephew-in-law: Jo Gyu-bin (조규빈, 趙奎彬) of the Yangju Jo clan 
 Grandnephew: Jo Yeong-jin (조영진, 趙榮進)
 Sister-in-law: Lady Yi of the Yeonan Yi clan (연안 이씨, 延安 李氏); daughter of Yi Deok-ro (이덕로, 李德老)
 Nephew: Min Ik-su (민익수, 閔翼洙) (1690 – 1742)
 Grandnephew: Min Baek-bun (민백분, 閔百奮) (1723 – ?)
 Grandniece: Lady Min of the Yeoheung Min clan (여흥 민씨, 驪興 閔氏)
 Grandniece: Lady Min of the Yeoheung Min clan (여흥 민씨, 驪興 閔氏)
 Nephew: Min Woo-su (민우수, 閔遇洙) (1694 - 1756)
 Niece-in-law: Lady Yun of Chilwon Yun clan (칠원 윤씨)
 Grandnephew: Min Baek-cheom (민백첨, 閔百瞻)
 Grandnephew: Min Baek-gyeom (민백겸, 閔百兼)
 Grandniece-in-law: Lady Lee (이씨, 李氏); daughter of Lee Gu (이구, 李絿)
 Great-Grandnephew: Min Jung-hyeon (민종현, 閔鍾顯) or Min Jung-ryeol (민종렬, 閔鍾烈) (1735 - 1798)
 Niece: Lady Min of the Yeoheung Min clan (여흥 민씨, 驪興 閔氏)
 Nephew-in-law: Kim Gwang-taek (김광택, 金光澤)
 Older brother: Min Jin-won (민진원) (1664 – 1736)
 Sister-in-law: Lady Yun of the Papyeong Yun clan (파평 윤씨)
 Nephew: Min Chang-su (민창수, 閔昌洙)
 Niece-in-law: Lady Kim of the (new) Andong Kim clan (신 안동 김씨, 新 安東 金氏)
 Grandnephew: Min Baek-sun (민백순, 閔百順)
 Nephew: Min Hyeong-su (민형수, 閔亨洙)
 Niece-in-law: Lady Yi of the Jeonju Yi clan (전주 이씨)
 Grandniece: Lady Min of the Yeoheung Min clan (여흥 민씨, 驪興 閔氏)
 Grandnephew-in-law: Hong Nak-in (홍낙인, 洪樂仁) (1729 – 19 June 1777)
 Grandnephew: Min Baek-sang (민백상, 閔百祥) (1711 – 1761)
 Grandnephew: Min Baek-heung (민백흥, 閔百興)
 Grandnephew: Min Baek-jeung (민백증, 閔百增)
 Grandnephew: Min Baek-gab (민백갑, 閔百甲)
 Nephew: Min Tong-su (민통수, 閔通洙)
 Niece-in-law: Lady Song of the Eunjin Song clan (은진 송씨, 恩津 宋氏)
 Grandnephew: Min Baek-seon (민백선, 閔百善)
 Niece: Lady Min of the Yeoheung Min clan (여흥 민씨, 驪興 閔氏)
 Nephew-in-law: Yi Ju-jin (이주진)
 Younger sister: Lady Min of the Yeoheung Min clan (여흥 민씨, 驪興 閔氏)
 Younger half-sister: Lady Min of the Yeoheung Min clan (여흥 민씨, 驪興 閔氏) (1671 – ?)
 Brother-in-law: Yi Man (이만, 李熳) (1669 - 1734)
 Younger sister: Min Jeong-seong, Lady Min of the Yeoheung Min clan (민정성 여흥 민씨) (1672 – 1672)
 Younger sister: Min Jeong-je, Lady Min of the Yeoheung Min clan (민정제 여흥 민씨) (1672 – ?)
 Brother-in-law: Shin Seok-hwa (신석화, 申錫華) (1672 – 1714)
 Younger half-brother: Min Jin-yeong (민진영, 閔鎭永) (1682 – 1724)
 Nephew: Min Ak-su (민악수, 閔樂洙)
 Grandnephew: Min Baek-sul (민백술, 閔百述)
 Nephew: Min Gak-su (민각수, 閔覺洙)
 Younger half-sister: Lady Min of the Yeoheung Min clan (여흥 민씨, 驪興 閔氏)
 Brother-in-law: Yi Jang-hui (이장휘, 李長輝)
 Younger half-sister: Lady Min of the Yeoheung Min clan (여흥 민씨, 驪興 閔氏)
 Brother-in-law: Hong Woo-jo (홍우조, 洪禹肇)
 Younger half-brother: Min Jin-chang (민진창, 閔鎭昌)
 Younger half-sister: Lady Min of the Yeoheung Min clan (여흥 민씨, 驪興 閔氏)
 Brother-in-law: Yu Hyeon (유현, 柳絢) (1686 - ?)

Husband

 Yi Sun, King Sukjong of Joseon (7 October 1661 – 12 July 1720) (이순 조선 숙종) — No issue.
 Father-in-law: King Hyeonjong of Joseon (조선 현종) (14 March 1641 – 17 September 1674)
 Mother-in-law: Queen Myeongseong of Cheongpung Kim clan (명성왕후 김씨) (13 June 1642 – 21 January 1684)

Trivia 
Inhyeon's eldest brother Min Jin-hu's great-great-great-granddaughter would eventually marry Inhyeon's step-great-great-great-great-adoptive-grandson, the future Emperor Gojong of the Korean Empire, becoming the famous Empress Myeongseong.

Emperor Gojong's mother, Grand Internal Princess Consort Sunmok, is a great-great-great-great-great-granddaughter of Queen Inhyeon's younger half-brother, Min Jin-yeong (through her father and his third wife, Lady Jo of the Pungyang Jo clan). Empress Sunmyeong is also a great-great-great-great-granddaughter through Queen Inhyeon's second eldest brother, Min Jin-won.

In popular culture

Drama 
Portrayed by Jo Mi-ryeong in the 1961 movie Jang Hui Bin.
Portrayed by Tae Hyun-sil in the 1968 film Femme Fatale, Jang Hee-bin.
Portrayed by Kim Min-jeong in the 1971 movie Jang Hee Bin.
Portrayed by Lee Hye-sook in the 1981 MBC TV series Women of History: Jang Hee Bin.
Portrayed by Park Sun-ae in the 1988 MBC TV series 500 Years of Joseon: Queen Inhyeon
Portrayed by Kim Won-hee in the 1995 SBS TV series Jang Hee Bin.
Portrayed by Park Sun-young in the 2002-2003 KBS TV series Jang Hee Bin.
 Portrayed by Park Ha-sun in the 2010 MBC TV series Dong Yi.
 Portrayed by Kim Hae-in in the 2012 tvN TV series Queen and I.
 Portrayed by Hong Soo-hyun in the 2013 SBS TV series Jang Ok-jung, Living by Love.
Portrayed by Lee Hyun-ji in the 2015 MBC Every 1 TV series Webtoon Hero Toondra Show

Novels 
 Queen Inhyeon’s story
 Femme Fatale, Jang Hee-bin by Lee Jun-beom and Min Ye-sa, 1994, ISBN 2-00-236900076-7
 Dong Yi by Lee Jun-hyeok, 2010, Literary Chunchusa, ISBN 978-89-7604-055-8

See also 
 Queen Wongyeong - Inhyeon's ascendant through her father
 Empress Myeongseong - Inhyeon's descendant through her older brother
 Empress Sunmyeong - Inhyeon's descendant through her second older brother

References

1667 births
1701 deaths
Royal consorts of the Joseon dynasty
Korean queens consort
Yeoheung Min clan
17th-century Korean women